Dorries or Dörries are names. Notable people with the name include:

 Dorries Dlakude, South African Member of Parliament
Jana Dörries (born 1975), German former swimmer
 Josef Dörries (1923–2007), German World War II and post-war soldier
 Nadine Dorries (born 1957), English Member of Parliament

See also
 Dorrie, name
Dora (given name)
Dorie
Doris (disambiguation)

Feminine given names
Surnames